This is a list of conferences and workshops in the area of cryptography.  

Financial Cryptography and Data Security, organized by IFCA
Monero Konferenco, organized by Monero

IACR affiliated

conferences 
IACR sponsors the following three conferences:
 Crypto (an annual event that takes place in the USA and is IACR sponsored since its inception) 
 Eurocrypt (an annual event that takes place in Europe and is IACR sponsored since its inception)
 Asiacrypt (an annual event that takes place in Asia and Australia and is IACR sponsored since 2000)

symposia 
The IACR also sponsors the following symposia. These have a different format from traditional academic computer science conferences. They have no published proceedings, and a significant proportion of the speakers are invited.
 RWC

Organized in cooperation with IACR
The following events are frequently organized in cooperation with IACR

 ACNS
 INDOCRYPT
 RSA Conference, cryptographers track
 SAC

Related areas
 FOCS (theory of computing)
 STOC (theory of computing)
 ICALP (theory of computing)
 CSS - International Conference on Cryptography and Security System (security)

References

External links
 Mihir Bellare's list
 IACR's List of Crypto Events

Cryptology Conferences